Newcestown GAA is a Gaelic football and hurling club based in the village of Newcestown in County Cork, Ireland. The club plays in the Carbery division of Cork GAA.

History
Founded in 1959, the club celebrated its 50th anniversary in 2009. It is a club with over 150 paid up members and the adult teams currently play in the Cork Senior Hurling Championship and Cork Senior Football Championship.

Honours
 Munster Intermediate Club Hurling Championship Runner-Up 2015
 Cork Premier Intermediate Hurling Championship Winners (1) 2015 Runners-Up 2014
 Cork Premier Intermediate Football Championship Winners (1) 2010
 Cork Intermediate Football Championship Winners (2) 1971, 2001 Runners-Up 1974
 Cork Junior Hurling Championship Winners (3) 1972, 1980, 1992 Runners-Up 1988
 Cork Junior Football Championship Winners (2) 1967, 1990
 Cork Under-21 Hurling Championship Winners (1) 1993 Runners-Up 1992
 Cork Under-21 A Hurling Championship (0) Runners-up 2019
 Cork Under-21 B Football Championship (1) 2019
 Cork Minor Hurling Championship Runners-Up 1990 (as Na Finna)
 Cork Minor A Hurling Championship Winners (2) 2019, 2012 Runners-Up 2005, 2007, 2011
 Cork Minor A Football Championship Winners (1) 2019, 2012
 Cork Intermediate Hurling League Winners (2) 2002, 2011
 Cork Minor A Hurling League Winners (1) 2007
 Cork Minor A Football League Winners (1) 2007
 Cork Intermediate Football Tom Creedon Cup Winners (1) 2006
 Cork Minor Non Exam Hurling Championship Winners (1) 2016
 South West Junior A Hurling Championship Winners (9) 1967, 1969, 1972, 1979, 1980, 1988, 1991, 1992, 2014, Runners-Up 1963, 1964, 1970, 1989, 2003, 2004, 2007
 South West Junior A Football Championship Winners (4) 1964, 1967, 1988, 1990 Runners-Up 1962, 1965, 1966, 1981, 1982, 1989
 West Cork Junior B Hurling Championship Winners (1) 1977 Runners-Up 1960
 West Cork Junior B Football Championship Winners (2) 1960, 2008 Runners-Up 1959
 West Cork Junior C Hurling Championship Winners (6) 1984, 1985, 1990, 2000, 2003, 2005 Runners-Up 1988, 1989, 2001
 West Cork Junior C Football Championship Winners  (5) 1982, 1990, 1992, 1999 (?), 2000 Runners-Up 1983, 1986, 1991, 1996, 1997
 West Cork Under-21 A Hurling Championship Winners (17)  1973, 1989, 1991, 1992, 1993, 1994, 1995, 1997, 1998, 2000, 2008, 2010, 2013, 2014, 2016, 2018, 2019 Runners-Up 1981, 1984, 1990, 2001, 2005, 2011, 2012
 West Cork Under 21 A Football Championship Winners (2) 2001, 2006 Runners-Up 2007, 2010, 2016
 West Cork Under-21 B Football Championship Winners (2) 2000, 2019
 West Cork Minor A Hurling Championship Winners (11) 1960, 1961, 1990, 1991, 1994, 1996, 1997, 1998, 2005, 2007 Runners-Up 1982, 1985, 1986, 2004, 2008, 2019
 West Cork Minor A Football Championship Winners (3) 1960(?), 2000, 2019 Runners-Up 1992, 2007
 West Cork Minor B Hurling Championship Runners-Up 1972, Winners 2016
 West Cork Minor B Football Championship Winners (3) 1961, 1969, 1981 Runners-Up 1965, 1968, 1980, 1991

Notable players
 Paddy Crowley: Hurler with Cork
 Tim Crowley: All-Ireland Senior Hurling medals with Cork
 Ger O'Driscoll: Hurler with Cork
 Kevin Kehily: Senior footballer with Cork
 Pat Kenneally: Hurler with Cork
 Luke Meade: Hurler with Cork

References

External sources

Gaelic games clubs in County Cork
Hurling clubs in County Cork
Gaelic football clubs in County Cork